Perfect Timing is the first and only studio album by American hip hop duo Boo & Gotti. It was released on August 26, 2003, through Cash Money Records and Universal Records. Recording sessions took place at Patchwerk Recording Studios in Atlanta, at Circle House Studios in Miami, at Quad Recording Studios in New York City, at Rockland Studios in Chicago, and at Cash Money Studios in New Orleans. Production was handled by Mannie Fresh, Kanye West, Jazze Pha, Leslie Brathwaite and R. Kelly. It features guest appearances from Big Tymers, Cadillac Tah, Gillie Da Kid, Jazze Pha, Lac, Lil' Wayne, Mikkey, R. Kelly, Stone, Tateeze and TQ.

Despite being released by one of hip hop's most popular labels, Perfect Timing was poorly promoted and failed commercially, only reaching 195 on the Billboard 200, dropping off the chart after only one week. The album's lead single was a collaboration with Lil' Wayne entitled "Ain't It Man", however the single failed to reach the Billboard charts. According to Gotti, the album sold around 80,000 copies as of 2015 in the U.S.

Track listing

 Sample credits
 "Chicago" contains a sample of "What's Your Name", written by Al Goodman, Harry Ray and Walter Morris, as performed by The Moments.
 "Think..." contains a sample of "Think it Over", written by William Hart, as performed by The Delfonics.

Chart history

References

External links

2003 debut albums
Cash Money Records albums
Albums produced by R. Kelly
Albums produced by Jazze Pha
Albums produced by Kanye West
Albums produced by Mannie Fresh